Sol Rezza (born April 7, 1982, Buenos Aires, Argentina) is an Argentinean composer and sound designer fusing experimental electronics with immersive audio. A specialist in surround sound and digital storytelling, she develops her work in virtual environments and live performances moving between art, psychoacoustics, and technology.

Combine multilingual voice samples, granular synthesis and sequencers with open-source multichannel audio technology like the SoundSquares plug-in.

Currently, she is developing research on how new technologies (AI, machine learning, VR, etc.) influence the creation and production of contemporary storytelling.

Early career
Her first steps in the radio environment are those made in Radio de la Ciudad LS1;  she worked as a production assistant  for the radio show "En la vereda" hosted by Quique Pesoa; and then worked as a radio producer on LRA Radio Nacional for the radio program "Hacha y tiza" hosted Argentine historian researcher Hugo Chumbita. In 2006-2007 she traveled through Chile, Bolivia, Perú, Ecuador, Colombia y México with the itinerant radio project Estudio Rodante with which to make her first foray into the field audio recording and began her first notes about it.

In 2009 she studied audio engineering and sound design and began experimenting with microphones and other sound devices.

She moved to México and started her experimental compositions and radio art work. In those years, she collaborated with different community radios with the radio experimental program titled El silencio NO existe.

Career

Since 2008 to date she conducts several workshops and lectures about sound design and deep listening for several institutions in Latin America as in Europe.

She wrote articles about sound experimentation, soundscape and deep listening to the magazine Sonograma, Sul Ponticello, among other publications.

In 2009, composed an album, titled Ex nihilo nihil fit based on texts by Oliverio Girondo. Although the album is not officially released it participated at Prix Bohemia Radio 2010  and the Electronic Language International Festival; from this exploratory work she will participate in different festivals related to sound experimentation in various parts of the world.

In 2015 the sound work 25 segundos de vida belonging to the album Ex nihilo nihil fit was selected to participate in the first exhibition of sound art in Argentina Umbrales - espacios del sonido.

During 2010 to 2012 with the Mexican multimedia artist Daniel Ivan, she made the first of a series of live performances titled Matar al Gato a multimedia art and sound art happening, whose outcome is a digital artwork by itself. This series of performances consists of three parts: the first part Matar al gato 01: conocimiento Funk based on the work of Amiri Baraka was presented May 25, 2010 at the museum Ex Teresa Arte Actual, the second performance and installation Matar al gato 02: Ekpyrotica was presented 07,08,09,10 June 2011 at the museum Laboratorio Arte Alameda in México city.

Her second album Verdades Minúsculas 2010 was selected by Festival Netaudio London 2011 and the Soundwaves Festival in Brighton, UK. In the same year, 2010, her radio piece El año del conejo, inspired by the texts El Pensamiento náhuatl cifrado en los calendarios by Laurette Séjourné, it's part of Journée Internationale de la Création Radiophonique  and the Radio Arts Space, international sound art and radio art exhibition.

In 2011 released on the Acustronica Label her experimental music, noise and soundscape work titled SPIT, receiving favorable reviews in ATTN Magazine  and Music on Tnt.

SPIT was selected by the artist Steve Heimbecker in the first series of concerts in 64-channel multi-channel surround sound system in 2011 and the track The Cat was broadcast on Late Junction BBC Radio 3.

That same year, 2011, she released The existence of the light experimental music work to be published solely on the social network Tumblr. This sound work was selected for use in the presentation of the BASA Awards 2011(Business of the Arts South Africa).

In 2012 she published her radio art work Shorts for Radio, a work under the public domain license and conceived as an homage to the Internet Archive. That same year she involved in the project SoundSpiral, an inflatable arts venue, created by sound artist Amie Slavin as part of her London 2012 Cultural Olympiad piece BabelSpring.

In 2013 she released 32 Turbulencias and in 2014 her experimental work Ntangu was played on Sonophilia Festival. Before the end of 2014 she published La simplicité d’une goutte, a work of experimental music and soundscape which was broadcast in the special radio show of Women's Day on KFAI Radio. In December 2014 the radio program Dr. Klangendum Concertzender Radio broadcast two special feature programs about Sol Rezza discography.

2015 

In 2015 her work titled In the darkness of the world was commissioned to be premiered as a broadcast and as a performance by the CTM Festival 2015 for Adventurous Music and Art 2015 in the Radio Lab call, co-commissioned by Deutschlandradio Kultur  – Hörspiel, ECAS – European Cities of Advanced Sound / ICAS – International Cities of Advanced Sound/ Klangkunst. The Wires Frances Morgan commented on Rezza's project: 
The project is imaginative and playful, drawing on classic radiophonic drama, and its spatial aspect should make the installation inviting and accessible
 
In The Darkness Of The World was an experimental radio broadcast/performance. Through sound design, experimental sound work, hydrophone and traditional recordings and soundscape manipulation, the artwork aims to reread the ambient, motifs and intricate geographies of the 19th-century classic Vingt mille lieues sous les mers by Jules Verne. The work received favorable reviews in The Crack magazine, Gonzo (circus), Mondo Magazin and M/Magazyn. The piece In the darkness of the world became part of the collection Sonosphere the Deutschlandradio Kultur.

In 2015 she participated as advisory board in the New York Festivals International Radio Program Awards. Since 2015 she collaborates with the Spanish magazine of music and sound art Sul Ponticello.

2018 

She was called by the German community radio station Radio Corax to be the first artist in residence specializing in radio art in the Radio Art Residency. She worked with the Radio Corax team developing a sound map Sound Mapping Halle of Halle with various pieces of experimental radio, there she produce the live performance entitled Opening, based on an interview with physicist Julian Barbour

2019 
She takes a part in the RadioPhonic Places festiva  in the context of the 100th anniversary of the Bauhaus University of Weimar with her production Rooms in your Mind.

At the end of 2019 she presents her work Pool commissioned by the Tsonami Festival and Kunstradio – Radiokunst

In 2019 she returns to Argentina where she presents her work Temazcal within the framework of the Ciclo de Arte Sonoro at the Centro Cultural Parque de España.

This same year she presents for the Proyecto Tanque - Music for Specific Site the quadraphonic performance Infinite Train at the Universidad Nacional de San Martín.

Radio Art
Sound Mapping Halle Radio Art residency 2018
El piso mortal 2017
El agujero negro 2017.
"Cartas a mi misma 2016.  
Ritual Radio 2016. 
In the darkness of the world. 2015. Deutschlandradio Kultur(Radio Version ).
KM/TB. 2014.
Shorts for Radio.2012.(Album)
Verdades Minúsculas. 2011. Netaudio Festival 2011 - Roundhouse.(Album)
El año del conejo. 2010. Festival Blink 2011.(Album)
Ex nihilo nihil fit. 2009.(Album)
Bird Migration. 2009. Electronic Language International Festival 2010.

Experimental Music
Pool. Festival Tsonami 2019
Rooms in your mind 2018
Storm/S. 2015–2016.
La simplicité d’une goutte. 2014.
Ntangu. 2014.
32 Turbulencias. 2013.(Album)
The existence of the light | La Existencia de la Luz. 2011.(Album)
SPIT. 2011.(Album)

Performance
Inundare 2021
Temazcal 2019 - 2020
Infinite Train. Proyecto Tanque 2019
Opening. Radio Art Residency 2018.
In the darkness of the world. CTM Festival 2015.
Matar al gato 2.2: Ekpirótica. Collaboration with Daniel Iván Laboratorio Arte Alameda 2012.
Matar al gato 2.0: Ekpirótica. Collaboration with Daniel Iván. 2011
Matar al Gato 1: Conocimiento Funk. Collaboration with Daniel Iván. Ex Teresa Arte Actual 2010.

Radio Productions
Ritual Radio 2016 
El silencio NO Existe 2009 - 2010 (radio series about experimental radio for community radio XHECA-FM).
Una chica hablando de sonido 2013-2014 (podcast radio series about audio engineering and music)

References

External links
Sol Rezza's 
Fifteen Questions Interview with Sol Rezza The Radio Star, 2015
Different forms of silence. Goethe-Institut 2018
Die argentinische Klangkünstlerin Sol Rezza Deutschlandfunk 2018
Sol Rezza el Primer espacio Constellations 2018
Listening to the City bauhaus-fm 2018
Sonidos sensiblemente alterados por el arte Página/12 Rosario/12 2019

Living people
Digital artists
Argentine contemporary artists
Noise musicians
Experimental composers
Experimental musicians
Argentine composers
Women in electronic music
1982 births
Women classical composers
Argentine radio producers
Sound artists
21st-century women musicians
20th-century women composers